The Netherlands Forensic Institute (Dutch Nederlands Forensisch Instituut)  is the national forensics institute of the Netherlands, located in the Ypenburg quarter of The Hague.

It is an autonomous division of the Dutch Ministry of Security and Justice and falls under the Directorate-General for the Administration of Justice and Law Enforcement.

History
On 30 July 1945, the government decided to set up a Justice Laboratory. Three years later, on 4 November 1948, the laboratory became a department of the Ministry of Justice.

A similar institution was founded in 1951: Gerechtelijk Geneeskundig Laboratorium (Judicial Medical Laboratory), which was later renamed Laboratorium voor Gerechtelijke Pathologie Laboratory for Judicial Pathology which were located at the building in The Hague which was later used by Europol.

Pathologist Dr. Jan Zeldenrust was the first CEO of this laboratory.

On 1 November 1999, the two laboratories merged into the Nederlands Forensisch Instituut (Netherlands Forensic Institute).

The laboratory was based in Rijswijk until October 2004, when it moved to the Ypenburg quarter of The Hague.

See also 

 Deventer murder case

References

External links
 Netherlands Forensic Institute
 Netherlands Forensic Institute 

Pathology organizations
1999 establishments in the Netherlands
Scientific organizations established in 1999
Forensics organizations
Medical and health organisations based in the Netherlands